LaVon K. Crosby (April 25, 1924 – July 27, 2016) was an American politician.

Born in Hastings, Nebraska, Crosby graduated from St. Cecilia's High School in Hastings, Nebraska in 1941. She graduated from University of Nebraska–Lincoln in 1987. In 1971, Crosby married former Nebraska Governor Robert B. Crosby. Crosby served in the Nebraska State Legislature from 1988 to 2000 and was a Republican.

Notes

1924 births
2016 deaths
People from Hastings, Nebraska
University of Nebraska–Lincoln alumni
Women state legislators in Nebraska
Republican Party Nebraska state senators
21st-century American women